Sir Richard Rivington Holmes, KCVO (16 November 1835 – 22 March 1911) was a British archivist and courtier.

Biography
Holmes was Royal Librarian at Windsor Castle, 1870-1905. He was appointed by Queen Victoria and was reappointed by King Edward VII in 1901.

He was a lieutenant-colonel of the 1st Volunteer Battalion, Berkshire Regiment. He was appointed Knight Commander of the Royal Victorian Order in January 1905. In 1895 He received the Queen Victoria Version of the Royal Household Long and Faithful Service Medal for 25 years service to the British Royal Family.

He died in London on 22 March 1911, and was buried at Upton, Buckinghamshire.

Family
In 1880, Holmes married Evelyn Gee, eldest daughter of the Reverend Richard Gee, Vicar of New Windsor and Canon of St George's Chapel, Windsor Castle.

Ethiopian collection
Holmes was part of the British Expedition to Abyssinia in 1868, during which many Ethiopian documents, cultural artefacts, and art objects were looted as spoils of war by British soldiers. Holmes himself took a large cache of loot from the Battle of Magdala back to Great Britain, much of which found its way into the British Museum. The looted Kwer’ata Re’esu icon (a European painting of Christ with the crown of thorns) remained in his personal possession.

See also
Royal Librarian (United Kingdom)

Notes 

Attribution

1835 births
1911 deaths
Knights Commander of the Royal Victorian Order
People educated at Highgate School
Royal Librarians